Takashi Kawamura may refer to:

 Takashi Kawamura (The Prince of Tennis), fictional character in the anime and manga The Prince of Tennis
 Takashi Kawamura (politician) (born 1948), Japanese politician
 Takashi Kawamura (businessman) (born 1939), current Chairman and former President of Hitachi